In chemistry, the standard state of a material (pure substance, mixture or solution) is a reference point used to calculate its properties under different conditions. A superscript circle ° (degree symbol) or a Plimsoll (⦵) character is used to designate a thermodynamic quantity in the standard state, such as change in enthalpy (ΔH°), change in entropy (ΔS°), or change in Gibbs free energy (ΔG°). The degree symbol has become widespread, although the Plimsoll is recommended in standards, see discussion about typesetting below.

In principle, the choice of standard state is arbitrary, although the International Union of Pure and Applied Chemistry (IUPAC) recommends a conventional set of standard states for general use. The standard state should not be confused with standard temperature and pressure (STP) for gases, nor with the standard solutions used in analytical chemistry. STP is commonly used for calculations involving gases that approximate an ideal gas, whereas standard state conditions are used for thermodynamic calculations.

For a given material or substance, the standard state is the reference state for the material's thermodynamic state properties such as enthalpy, entropy, Gibbs free energy, and for many other material standards. The standard enthalpy change of formation for an element in its standard state is zero, and this convention allows a wide range of other thermodynamic quantities to be calculated and tabulated. The advantage of this practice is that tables of thermodynamic properties prepared in this way are self-consistent.

Conventional standard states
Many standard states are non-physical states, often referred to as "hypothetical states". Nevertheless, their thermodynamic properties are well-defined, usually by an extrapolation from some limiting condition, such as zero pressure or zero concentration, to a specified condition (usually unit concentration or pressure) using an ideal extrapolating function, such as ideal solution or ideal gas behavior, or by empirical measurements. Strictly speaking, temperature is not part of the definition of a standard state. However, most tables of thermodynamic quantities are compiled at specific temperatures, most commonly  or, somewhat less commonly, .

Gases
The standard state for a gas is the hypothetical state it would have as a pure substance obeying the ideal gas equation at standard pressure. No real gas has perfectly ideal behavior, but this definition of the standard state allows corrections for non-ideality to be made consistently for all the different gases.

Liquids and solids
For most elements, the reference point of ΔHf⦵ = 0 is defined for the most stable allotrope of the element, such as graphite in the case of carbon, and the β-phase (white tin) in the case of tin. An exception is white phosphorus, the most common allotrope of phosphorus, which is defined as the standard state despite the fact that it is only metastable.

Solutes
For a substance in solution (solute), the standard state C° is usually chosen as the hypothetical state it would have at the standard state molality or amount concentration but exhibiting infinite-dilution behavior (where there are no solute-solute interactions, but solute-solvent interactions are present). The reason for this unusual definition is that the behavior of a solute at the limit of infinite dilution is described by equations which are very similar to the equations for ideal gases. Hence taking infinite-dilution behavior to be the standard state allows corrections for non-ideality to be made consistently for all the different solutes.

Other choices are possible. For example, the use of a standard state concentration of 10−7 mol/L for the hydrogen ion in a real, aqueous solution is common in the field of biochemistry. In other application areas such as electrochemistry, the standard state is sometimes chosen as the actual state of the real solution at a standard concentration (often ). The activity coefficients will not transfer from convention to convention and so it is very important to know and understand what conventions were used in the construction of tables of standard thermodynamic properties before using them to describe solutions.

Adsorbates
For molecules adsorbed on surfaces there have been various conventions proposed based on hypothetical standard states. The advantage of using  is that the configurational term cancels and the entropy extracted from thermodynamic analyses is thus reflective of intra-molecular changes between the bulk phase (such as gas or liquid) and the adsorbed state. There may be benefit to tabulating values based on both the relative coverage based standard state and in an additional column the absolute coverage based standard state. For 2D gas states, the complication of discrete states does not arise and an absolute density base standard state has been proposed, similar for the 3D gas phase.

Typesetting
At the time of development in the nineteenth century, the superscript Plimsoll symbol (⦵) was adopted to indicate the non-zero nature of the standard state. IUPAC recommends in the 3rd edition of Quantities, Units and Symbols in Physical Chemistry a symbol which seems to be a degree sign (°) as a substitute for the plimsoll mark. In the very same publication the plimsoll mark appears to be constructed by combining a horizontal stroke with a degree sign. A range of similar symbols are used in the literature: a stroked lowercase letter O (o), a superscript zero (0) or a circle with a horizontal bar either where the bar extends beyond the boundaries of the circle or is enclosed by the circle, dividing the circle in half.

Ian M. Mills, who was involved in producing a revision of Quantities, Units and Symbols in Physical Chemistry, suggested that a superscript zero is an equal alternative to indicate "standard state", though a degree symbol (°) is used in the same article. The degree symbol has come into widespread use in general, inorganic, and physical chemistry textbooks in recent years.

See also
 Standard conditions for temperature and pressure
 Standard molar entropy

References
 
 

Thermodynamics

mk:Стандардна состојба
ur:معیاری حالات